Joe William Valerio (born February 11, 1969) is a former American football offensive lineman. He was in the second round (50th overall) of the 1991 NFL draft by the Kansas City Chiefs. He played college football at Pennsylvania.

College football career
Valerio attended the University of Pennsylvania, majoring in economics. In 1987, he was named the Offensive Most Valuable Player (MVP) of the freshman team. In 1988, he was the only sophomore to letter on offense for a team that went 9-1 and won the Ivy League championship. As a junior in 1989, he was named First-team All-Ivy League, and received the schools Bagnell Award, an award given to the most improved player. As a senior in 1990, he was named a team captain, and a pre-season All-American. After the end of his senior season, he was awarded the Bednarik award for the team's top lineman, the Munger award for being the team's MVP, as well as first-team All-Ivy League for a second time, first-team All-ECAC, first-team All-America (Associated Press and Walter Camp). He was also selected to play in the East-West Shrine Game.

Professional football career

Valerio was selected in the second round (50th overall) of the 1991 NFL draft by the Kansas City Chiefs. During his time with the Chiefs, he was occasionally placed as a tight end in the Chiefs "jumbo" formations in short yardage situations. He recorded 4 receptions for 7 yards, and 4 touchdowns. He was released by the Chiefs on August 25, 1996. In September 1996 he joined the St. Louis Rams. While with the Rams, he appeared in just one game.

In 2005, Valerio was inducted into the University of Pennsylvania Athletics Hall of Fame.

Post-football career
Valerio retired after the 1996 season and began working in the insurance industry by serving as a Regional Operations Officer at Willis North America, Inc. He then served as the Managing Director for Wells Fargo Insurance Services in Philadelphia. Then in 2011, he began to work at TD Insurance/USI Insurance Services, as the Senior Vice President of Regional Sales Manager for the Mid-Atlantic Region. In June 2013, he joined Lyons Companies as the Vice President of Business Development.

He also served as an assistant football coach at Garnet Valley High School in Glen Mills, Pennsylvania.

Personal life
As of 2011, Valerio was married to his wife Jennifer, and had triplet daughters.

References

External links
 Penn Quakers bio
 The 7 best NFL revenge games of the last 25 years, ranked
 Fat guy glory: Watch 11 offensive linemen scoring touchdowns

Living people
1969 births
Penn Quakers football players
Kansas City Chiefs players
Birmingham Fire players
Players of American football from Pennsylvania
People from Delaware County, Pennsylvania
American football centers
Ridley High School alumni